Phrygius a Neleid, was king of Miletus after Phobius, who fell in love with Pieria daughter of Pythes from Myus, at a festival of Artemis. He promises anything, and Pieria asks for peace between the two cities, which were at war. In this way, the hostility between Miletus and Myus stopped.

Note

References 
Pierre Grimal
Parthenius of Nicaea Erotica Pathemata 14
Plutarch Virtues of Women 16
Polyaenus 8.35

Kings in Greek mythology
Miletus
Ionian mythology